Bako is a genus of lace bugs in the family Tingidae. There are about nine described species in Bako.

Species
 Bako arabianus Rodrigues, 1987
 Bako capeneri Drake, 1956
 Bako dieides Drake & Ruhoff, 1961
 Bako distinctus Rodrigues, 1981
 Bako editus Drake, 1956
 Bako lebruni Schouteden, 1923
 Bako lepidus Rodrigues, 1981
 Bako linnavuorii Rodrigues, 1977
 Bako malayanus (Drake, 1947)

References

Further reading

 
 
 
 
 

Tingidae